The Jilun Cycling Team is a Chinese UCI Continental cycling team established in 2011.

In October 2015, the team signed Mustafa Sayar after completing his doping ban.

Team roster

Major wins
2012
Stage 7 Tour of Taihu Lake, Sébastien Jullien

References

External links

UCI Continental Teams (Asia)
Cycling teams established in 2011
Cycling teams based in China